Petra Hule (born 5 March 1999) is an Australian tennis player.

Hule has a career high WTA singles ranking of 449 achieved on 19 December 2022. She also has a career high WTA doubles ranking of 379 achieved on 9 January 2023.

Hule made her Grand Slam main draw debut at the 2023 Australian Open in the doubles draw partnering Arina Rodionova. She played college tennis at Florida State University.

ITF Finals

References

External links

1999 births
Living people
Australian female tennis players
Sportspeople from Adelaide
Florida State Seminoles women's tennis players